Falling Free is a science fiction novel by American writer Lois McMaster Bujold, part of her Vorkosigan Saga. It was first published as four installments in Analog from December 1987 to February 1988, and won the Nebula Award for Best Novel for 1988. It is included in the 2007 omnibus Miles, Mutants and Microbes.

Plot summary
The novel is set about 200 years before the birth of Miles Vorkosigan, the protagonist of much of the Vorkosigan series. It deals with the creation of the "Quaddies", genetically modified people who have four arms, the second pair appearing where unmodified humans would have legs. They were intended to be used as a space labor force, superbly adapted to zero-gravity but more or less helpless "downside" in any but the lightest gravitational field. From the point of view of the commercial interests responsible for their creation, they would be highly profitable laborers, requiring none of the special facilities or mandatory time off needed by other humans, whose bodies tend to deteriorate over the long term in weightlessness. They would also be completely beholden to the company for life support and would have no rights as human beings.

Legally, the Quaddies are not classed as human but as "post-fetal experimental tissue cultures". The company treats them as chattel slaves. Their access to information is tightly controlled; even their children's stories are about working in space. They can be ordered to reproduce or to have a pregnancy terminated. They are the subject of breeding programs, the company compelling them to mate only with one of the company's choosing, regardless of existing partners. When a new artificial gravity technology renders them both obsolete and a potential political embarrassment to the executives, there are discussions about killing or sterilizing them. Bipedal engineer Leo Graf, who had been assigned to help train them, instead helps them break free. They eventually settle in an initially remote system that gradually becomes a major part of the Nexus.

Bujold has stated in the notes of her reprints that Falling Free was the first half of the intended story. The unwritten, second story was to tell how the Quaddies settled into what would be known as "Quaddiespace". Diplomatic Immunity, published in 2002, revisits the subject of the Quaddies, showing the state of their society some 240 years after its foundation. It takes place on Graf Station, named for Leo Graf, who is hero and patriarch to the Quaddies.

Characters
Leo Graf – a genetically unmodified human engineer, he is based on the author's father, Robert Charles McMaster (1913–1986). He is hired to help train the Quaddies in reliable space-engineering practices. Graf is unaware of the nature of the Quaddies until he arrives at the station.  He becomes sympathetic to their plight, and when he learns of the company's plans for them in the wake of the new artificial gravity technologies, he works out plans for their escape.
Silver – a young female Quaddie who is instrumental in assisting Leo Graf in the escape of the Quaddies.  She later becomes his romantic partner.

References

1988 American novels
1988 science fiction novels
American science fiction novels
Nebula Award for Best Novel-winning works
Novels by Lois McMaster Bujold
Vorkosigan Saga
Novels about genetic engineering